This is a discography of The Merry Widow (German: Die lustige Witwe), an operetta by the Austro–Hungarian composer Franz Lehár. It was first performed at the Theater an der Wien in Vienna on 30 December 1905.  The operetta has been recorded both live and in the studio many times, and several video recordings have been made.  The first recording of a substantially complete version of the score was made in 1907 with Marie Ottmann and Gustav Matzner in the lead roles. The next full recording was issued in 1950, in English with Dorothy Kirsten and Robert Rounseville in the leading roles. 

In 1953, EMI's  Columbia label released a near-complete version produced by Walter Legge, conducted by Otto Ackermann, with Elisabeth Schwarzkopf as Hanna, Erich Kunz as Danilo, Nicolai Gedda as Camille and Emmy Loose as  Valencienne. It was sung in German, with abridged spoken dialogue. Loose sang Valencienne again for Decca in the first stereophonic recording, produced in 1958 by John Culshaw, with Hilde Gueden, Per Grundén and Waldemar Kmentt in the other main roles, and the Vienna Philharmonic conducted by Robert Stolz. A second recording with Schwarzkopf as Hanna was issued by Columbia in 1963; the other main roles were sung by Eberhard Wächter, Gedda and Hanny Steffek. This set, conducted by Lovro von Matačić, has been reissued on CD in EMI's "Great Recordings of the Century" series. Among later complete or substantially complete sets are those conducted by Herbert von Karajan with Elizabeth Harwood as Hanna (1972); Franz Welser-Möst with Felicity Lott (1993); and John Eliot Gardiner with Cheryl Studer (1994).

The Ackermann recording received the highest available rating in the 1956 The Record Guide and the later EMI set under Matačić is highly rated by the 2008 The Penguin Guide to Recorded Classical Music, but Alan Blyth in his Opera on CD regrets the casting of a baritone as Danilo in both sets and prefers the 1958 Decca version. Among the filmed productions on DVD, the Penguin Guide recommends the one from the San Francisco Opera, recorded live in 2001, conducted by Erich Kunzel and directed by Lotfi Mansouri, with Yvonne Kenny as Hanna and Bo Skovhus as Danilo.

The recordings listed below are sung in German unless otherwise noted.

Audio

Video

References
Notes

Sources
Operadis discography, accessed 11 May 2011
Blyth, Alan. Opera on CD. London: Kyle Cathie, 1992. 
March, Ivan (ed). Penguin Guide to Recorded Classical Music 2008. London: Penguin Books, 2007. 
Sackville-West, Edward, and Desmond Shawe-Taylor. The Record Guide. London: Collins, 1956. OCLC 500373060

Merry Widow